Henry Wagener (September 4, 1891 – December 5, 1979) was an American businessman, farmer, and politician.

Henry Wagener was born on a farm in Waconia, Carver County, Minnesota. He lived in Waconia with his wife and family and was a farmer and farm machinery dealer. Wagener was also a well driller. He served in the Minnesota Senate from 1943 to 1954 and was a member of the Conservative Caucus. Wagener died in Carver County.

References

1891 births
1979 deaths
People from Waconia, Minnesota
Businesspeople from Minnesota
Farmers from Minnesota
Minnesota state senators